Justice Lucas may refer to:

Daniel B. Lucas (1836–1909), associate justice of the Supreme Court of Appeals of West Virginia
Malcolm Lucas (1927–2016), chief justice of the Supreme Court California
Raymond B. Lucas (1890–1966), associate justice of the Supreme Court of Missouri

See also
Judge Lucas (disambiguation)